Sir David McVicar (born 1966) is a Scottish opera and theatre director.

Biography
McVicar was born in Glasgow in 1966. He studied as an actor at the Royal Scottish Academy of Music and Drama, graduating in 1989. In 2007, The Independent ranked him among the 100 most influential gay and lesbian people in Britain. He was the guest on the BBC's Desert Island Discs on 5 October 2008.

He was created a Knight Bachelor in the 2012 Birthday Honours for services to opera.

Selected productions
Adriana Lecouvreur: Royal Opera House
Andrea Chenier: Royal Opera House
Agrippina: La Monnaie, Théâtre des Champs-Élysées, English National Opera
Aida: Royal Opera House
Alcina: Bilbao, Oviedo, English National Opera
Anna Bolena: Metropolitan Opera 2011
Billy Budd: Lyric Opera of Chicago
La bohème: Glyndebourne Festival Opera
Carmen: Glyndebourne Festival Opera
Cavalleria rusticana/Pagliacci: Metropolitan Opera 2015
La clemenza di Tito: English National Opera
Les contes d'Hoffmann: Salzburg Festival, Vlaamse Opera
Don Carlos: Metropolitan Opera 2022
Don Giovanni: La Monnaie
Elektra: Lyric Opera of Chicago
Faust: La Monnaie
Fedora: Metropolitan Opera, 2022
Fidelio: New Zealand International Arts Festival
Giulio Cesare: Glyndebourne Festival Opera, Metropolitan Opera 2013
Hamlet: Opera North
Idomeneo: Vlaamse Opera, Scottish Opera
L'incoronazione di Poppea: Théâtre des Champs-Élysées, Opéra national du Rhin, Copenhagen Opera House
Macbeth: Mariinsky Theatre, Royal Opera House
Madama Butterfly: Scottish Opera
Manon: New Zealand Opera, Dallas Opera, Houston Grand Opera, Liceu 
Maria Stuarda: Metropolitan Opera, 2013
Medea: Metropolitan Opera, 2022
A Midsummer Night's Dream: La Monnaie
Norma: Metropolitan Opera, 2017
Le nozze di Figaro: Royal Opera House
The Rape of Lucretia: Aldeburgh Festival
Il re pastore: Opera North
Rigoletto: Royal Opera House
Rusalka: Lyric Opera of Chicago
Der Rosenkavalier: Opera North, Scottish Opera
Roberto Devereux: Metropolitan Opera 2016
Salome: Royal Opera House
Semele: Théâtre des Champs-Élysées, Opéra national du Rhin
Sweeney Todd: Opera North
Tamerlano: Deutsche Oper am Rhein
Tosca: English National Opera, Metropolitan Opera 2017
Il trovatore: Metropolitan Opera 2013, Lyric Opera of Chicago, San Francisco Opera
Wozzeck: Lyric Opera of Chicago
Die Zauberflöte: La Monnaie, Royal Opera House

Video recordings
McVicar's productions of Faust, Le nozze di Figaro, Die Zauberflöte, Rigoletto and Salome at the Royal Opera House, Covent Garden, his Carmen and much-acclaimed Giulio Cesare at Glyndebourne, and his Manon at the Liceu are all available on DVD.

Of his thirteen productions for the Metropolitan Opera, eleven are available for streaming in HD video at Met Opera on Demand: 
Il Trovatore (performances of 30 April 2011 and 3 October 2015)
Anna Bolena (15 October 2011)
Maria Stuarda (19 January 2013)
Giulio Cesare (27 April 2013)
Cavalleria Rusticana & Pagliacci (25 April 2015)
Roberto Devereux (16 April 2016)
Norma (7 October 2017)
Tosca (27 January 2018)
Adriana Lecouvreur (12 January 2019)
Agrippina (29 February 2020).
Don Carlos (26 March 2022).

References

External links
Schedule at Operabase

1966 births
Living people
Theatre people from Glasgow
British opera directors
Alumni of the Royal Conservatoire of Scotland
Scottish theatre directors
Knights Bachelor
LGBT theatre directors
Scottish gay actors
Helpmann Award winners
British theatre directors
21st-century LGBT people